The 1964 Penn State Nittany Lions football team represented the Pennsylvania State University in the 1964 NCAA University Division football season. The team was coached by Rip Engle and played its home games in Beaver Stadium in University Park, Pennsylvania.

Schedule

References

Penn State
Penn State Nittany Lions football seasons
Lambert-Meadowlands Trophy seasons
Penn State Nittany Lions football